Martha Elizabeth Pollack (born August 27, 1958) is an American computer scientist who has served as the 14th president of Cornell University since April 2017. Previously, she served as the 14th provost and executive vice president for academic affairs of the University of Michigan from 2013 to 2017. 

Pollack's research specialty is artificial intelligence, where her contributions include works in planning, natural language processing, and activity recognition for cognitive assistance. She also serves on the board of directors of IBM.

Education
Pollack completed her undergraduate studies in linguistics at Dartmouth College, graduating in 1979. She earned master's and doctoral degrees in computer science from the University of Pennsylvania, completing her Ph.D. in 1986 under the joint supervision of Bonnie Webber and Barbara J. Grosz.

Career and research
Before joining the University of Michigan faculty in 2000, she worked at SRI International from 1985 to 1992, and was on the faculty of the University of Pittsburgh from 1991 to 2000. She became dean of the School of Information at Michigan in 2007, Vice Provost in 2010, and Provost in 2013. She has also been program chair of the International Joint Conferences on Artificial Intelligence in 1997, editor-in-chief of the Journal of Artificial Intelligence Research from 2001 to 2005, and president of the Association for the Advancement of Artificial Intelligence from 2009 to 2010.

Pollack was the winner of the 1991 IJCAI Computers and Thought Award.  She has been a fellow of the Association for the Advancement of Artificial Intelligence since 1996, and of the Association for Computing Machinery and the American Association for the Advancement of Science since 2012. She was elected to the American Academy of Arts and Sciences in 2022.

On November 14, 2016, the Cornell University Board of Trustees announced that they had unanimously elected her as Cornell University’s 14th president, with her presidency beginning on April 17, 2017. Pollack was officially inaugurated on August 25, 2017.

As President 

Martha Pollack has made significant changes to Greek Life on campus, including banning all hard alcohol from events, suspending chapters suspected of hazing, and requiring a full-time live-in advisor for each fraternity and sorority house. She has also introduced plans to improve mental health services on campus after widespread criticism of Cornell's culture and lack of support for students in need, and rejected calls from the Boycott, Divestment and Sanctions movement for Cornell to boycott investments in Israeli businesses.

References

1958 births
Living people
American computer scientists
American women computer scientists
Dartmouth College alumni
University of Pittsburgh faculty
University of Michigan faculty
Fellows of the American Association for the Advancement of Science
Fellows of the Association for the Advancement of Artificial Intelligence
Fellows of the Association for Computing Machinery
Presidents of Cornell University
University of Pennsylvania alumni
People from Stamford, Connecticut
Presidents of the Association for the Advancement of Artificial Intelligence
Women heads of universities and colleges
Natural language processing researchers
Artificial intelligence researchers
American women academics
21st-century American women